= NuggMD =

American telemedicine company

NuggMD is an American telemedicine company founded in 2015 that provides online medical cannabis evaluations. The company connects patients with licensed medical professionals through video consultations to assess their eligibility for medical cannabis recommendations.

In January 2021, NuggMD began serving patients in New Jersey; the company reported that licensed doctors had issued more than 650,000 medical cannabis cards through its platform. In March 2021, it launched evaluations in Connecticut, reporting that it had connected more than 700,000 patients with medical marijuana doctors since 2016. At that time, it operated in 11 states. By 2026, the company reported serving more than two million patients in 31 U.S. states, and had expanded into Germany and the United Kingdom.
